Anethole trithione, anetholtrithione, or anetholtrithion (JAN) is a drug used in the treatment of dry mouth. It is listed in the U.S. National Cancer Institute's Dictionary of Cancer Terms as being studied in the treatment of cancer.  Anethole trithione is an organosulfur compound, specifically, a dithiole-thione derivative.

Brand names
 Felviten
 Halpen
 Hepasulfol - Franco-Indian Pharmaceuticals
 Heporal
 Mucinol - Sanofi-Aventis
 Sialor - Paladin Laboratories; Pharmascience; Solvay; Zuoz Pharma
 Sonicur - Solvay
 Sulfarlem - Solvay; Aguettant; Edward Keller; Sanofi-Aventis
 Sulfarlem S - EG Labo
 Tiopropen
 Tiotrifar

See also
Anethole

References 

Dithioles
Thiocarbonyl compounds
Phenol ethers
AbbVie brands